Marcus Julius Gessius Marcianus also known as Gessius Marcianus (flourished second half of the 2nd century and first half of the 3rd century, died 218) was a Syrian Roman aristocrat. He was the second husband of Julia Avita Mamaea and step-father of the future emperor Severus Alexander.

Early life
Little is known about the origins of Marcianus. He originally came from Arca Caesarea (modern Arqa, Lebanon). He was an Equestrian officer who became a Promagistrate. No further details are known of the political career of Marcianus.

Family
Cassius Dio mentions a daughter that was married in 218 AD, thus probably a child from a previous marriage than the one to Mamaea. Marcianus married the Roman Syrian noblewoman Julia Avita Mamaea, as her second husband. Mamaea was the second daughter of the powerful Roman Syrian nobles Julia Maesa and Julius Avitus. Her maternal aunt was the Roman empress Julia Domna (wife of emperor Septimius Severus), thus her maternal cousins were Roman emperors Caracalla and Publius Septimius Geta, she was also the maternal aunt to Roman emperor Elagabalus. The marriage of Marcianus and Mamaea may have strengthened Septimius Severus' power base in the Roman Eastern provinces. He and Mamaea may have had a son named Marcus Julius Gessius Bassianus. The Historia Augusta also mentions a sister of Severus Alexander named Theoclia who was of marriageable age during Alexanders reign.

Death
He was murdered on the orders of Roman emperor Macrinus in 218 in Emesa, Syria alongside an unnamed daughter and son-in-law.

Severan dynasty family tree

References

Sources
 Augustan History, The Two Maximini 
A.R. Birley, Septimius Severus: The African Emperor, Routledge, 2002
Julia Avita Mamaea’s article at Livius.org
Alexander Severus (A.D. 222–235) - De Imperatoribus Romanis by H.W. Benario

Ancient Roman equites
2nd-century Romans
2nd-century people
3rd-century Romans
3rd-century people
3rd-century executions
Emesene dynasty
Julii
Gessii
People of Roman Syria
People executed by the Roman Empire
Year of birth unknown
218 deaths